Brian Woodall (born 28 December 1987) is an English footballer who plays as a striker.

Career
Woodall began his career with German club SC Herford, before returning to England and playing for Hinckley United. In February 2008, he moved to Gresley Rovers. Woodall moved to Atherstone Town in February 2009, but returned to Gresley in March on loan. Following an unsuccessful trial with Nuneaton Town, he moved to Coventry Sphinx, playing just a few games before rejoining Gresley. He finished the 2009–10 season as the club's top goalscorer with 30 goals and in 2010–11 was named the club's Player of the Year.

He moved to Dagenham & Redbridge in July 2011, and made his professional debut on 9 August, coming on as a substitute in their 5–0 away loss to Bournemouth in the Football League Cup Second Round.

In November 2013, Woodall joined Conference South side Dover Athletic on a two-month loan deal.

On 2 January 2014, Woodall left Dagenham & Redbridge by mutual consent.

On 3 January 2014, Woodall joined Conference South side Bishop's Stortford, where he had scored six goals in 11 appearances on loan the previous season. He scored the winning goal on his first game as Stortford won 3–2 at Dover Athletic.

Career statistics

References

External links

1987 births
Living people
English footballers
Association football forwards
Gresley F.C. players
Coventry Sphinx F.C. players
Atherstone Town F.C. players
Hinckley United F.C. players
Dagenham & Redbridge F.C. players
Bishop's Stortford F.C. players
Dover Athletic F.C. players
English Football League players
National League (English football) players